Discophlebia celaena, the variable stub moth, is a moth of the family Oenosandridae. The species was first described by Alfred Jefferis Turner in 1903. It is found in the south-east quarter of Australia.

The wingspan is about 40 mm.

External links
Australian Faunal Directory

Oenosandridae